Brackin Karauria-Henry (born 31 July 1988) is a New Zealand rugby footballer who has played rugby sevens for  Australia.  he plays for Japanese Top League club NTT Com Shining Arcs. He previously played Super Rugby for the Brumbies and NSW Waratahs. His usual position is centre.

Rugby career
In 2006 Karauria-Henry left New Zealand to play rugby league in Australia for the Cronulla Sharks in the NSW Cup competition. He was just 16 at the time and attended Endeavour Sports High in Sydney.

He switched codes in 2009 to play rugby union for Southern Districts and became qualified to play for Australia. Selected in the national sevens team, Karauria-Henry was Australia's leading try scorer during the 2009–10 Sevens World Series circuit. He signed with the Brumbies in 2010 and, in October that year, was selected to join the Wallabies training squad for the 2010 Spring Tour.

Karauria-Henry joined the NSW Waratahs for a further two seasons of Super Rugby, before moving to Japan where he signed with NTT Com.

References

External links
Search for "Karauria" at rugbyleagueproject.org
Stars of Tomorrow - Brackin Karauria Henry
Brackin Karauria-Henry at aru.rugby.com.au
Endeavouring to please: schoolboy league star finds feet in new code

1988 births
Living people
Rugby union players from Auckland
Rugby league players from Auckland
Japan international rugby sevens players
Australia international rugby sevens players
New Zealand rugby union players
New Zealand rugby league players
ACT Brumbies players
Expatriate rugby union players in Japan
New South Wales Waratahs players
New Zealand emigrants to Australia
Urayasu D-Rocks players
People educated at Endeavour Sports High School
Rugby union centres
Rugby sevens players at the 2020 Summer Olympics
Olympic rugby sevens players of Japan
Rugby union wings
Rugby union fullbacks
Mitsubishi Sagamihara DynaBoars players